Barbora Lancz (born 28 July 2002) is a Slovak female handball player for Mosonmagyaróvári KC SE and the Slovak national team.

She represented Slovakia at the 2021 World Women's Handball Championship in Spain.

References

2002 births
Living people
Slovak female handball players
Expatriate handball players
Slovak expatriate sportspeople in Hungary
People from Nové Zámky
Sportspeople from the Nitra Region